Joushuu may refer to:

Jōshū (disambiguation)
Zhaozhou (disambiguation)